The following outline is provided as an overview of and topical guide to Iran:

Iran – sovereign country located in Southwest Asia and the Middle East. Iran is bound by the Gulf of Oman and the Persian Gulf to the south and the Caspian Sea to its north. Shi'a Islam is the official religion, and Persian is the official language. Iran is home to one of the world's oldest continuous major civilizations, with historical and urban settlements dating back to 4000 BC. Throughout history, Iran has been of geostrategic importance because of its central location in Eurasia and is a regional power. The political system of Iran, based on the 1979 Constitution, comprises several intricately connected governing bodies. The highest state authority is the Supreme Leader, currently Ayatollah Ali Khamenei.

General reference 

 Pronunciation:
 Common English country name: Iran, archaic Persia
 Official English country name: The Islamic Republic of Iran
 Common endonym(s):  
 Official endonym(s):  
 Adjectival(s): Iranian 
 Demonym(s):
 Etymology: Name of Iran
 International rankings of Iran
 18th largest country
 17th most populous country
 ISO country codes: IR, IRN, 364
 ISO region codes: See ISO 3166-2:IR
 Internet country code top-level domain:  .ir

Geography of Iran 

Geography of Iran
 Iran is: a country
 Location:
 Northern Hemisphere and Eastern Hemisphere
 Eurasia
 Asia
 Southwest Asia
 Middle East
 Iranian plateau
 Armenian highlands
 Caucasus (partly)
 Time zone:  Iran Standard Time UTC+03:30, Iran Daylight Time UTC+04:30
 Extreme points of Iran
 High:  Damavand 
 Low:  Caspian Sea 
 Land boundaries: 5,440 km
 1,458 km
 992 km
 950 km
 950 km
 611 km
 499 km
 35 km
 Coastline: 2,440 km
 Population of Iran: 79,966,230 people (2017 estimate) - 18th most populous country
 Area of Iran:   - 18th largest country
 Atlas of Iran

Environment of Iran 

Environment of Iran
 Climate of Iran
 Environmental issues in Iran
 Renewable energy in Iran
 Geology of Iran
 List of earthquakes in Iran
 Protected areas of Iran
 Biosphere reserves in Iran
 National parks of Iran
 Wildlife of Iran
 Fauna of Iran
 Birds of Iran
 Mammals of Iran

Natural geographic features of Iran 

 Glaciers of Iran: None
 Islands of Iran
 Lakes of Iran
 Mountains of Iran
 Volcanoes in Iran
 Rivers of Iran
 Waterfalls of Iran
 Valleys of Iran
 List of World Heritage Sites in Iran

Regions of Iran

Ecoregions of Iran 

List of ecoregions in Iran

Administrative divisions of Iran 

Administrative divisions of Iran
 Provinces of Iran
 Counties of Iran
 Municipalities of Iran

Provinces of Iran 

Provinces of Iran

Counties of Iran 

Counties of Iran

Municipalities of Iran 

Municipalities of Iran
 Cities of Iran
 Capital of Iran: Tehran

Demography of Iran 

Demographics of Iran

Government and politics of Iran 

Politics of Iran
 Form of government: Islamic republic
 Capital of Iran: Tehran
 Elections in Iran
 Political parties in Iran
 Taxation in Iran

Branches of the government of Iran 

Government of Iran

Executive branch of the government of Iran 
 Assembly of Experts
 Elects the Supreme Leader
 Has the constitutional authority to remove the Supreme Leader from power at any time
 Supervises the Supreme Leader in the performance of legal duties
 Head of state: Supreme Leader of Iran, Ali Khamenei
 Head of government: President of Iran, Ebrahim Raisi
 Vice President of Iran - anyone appointed by the President to lead an organization related to presidential affairs. There are currently 10 Vice Presidents in Iran:
First Vice President, Eshaq Jahangiri
Vice President and Head of Atomic Energy Organization of Iran, Ali Akbar Salehi
Vice President and Head of Environmental Protection Organization, Masoumeh Ebtekar
Vice President and Head of Management and Planning Organization, Mohammad Bagher Nobakht
Vice President for Executive Affairs, Mohammad Shariatmadari
Vice President for Science and Technology and Head of Iran's National Elites Foundation, Sorena Sattari
Vice President for Legal Affairs, Elham Aminzadeh
Vice President for Parliamentary Affairs, Majid Ansari
Vice President for International Affairs, Akbar Torkan
Vice President and Head of Foundation of Martyrs and Veterans Affairs, Mohammad-Ali Shahidi
Vice President and Head of Cultural Heritage, Handcrafts and Tourism Organization, Mohammad-Ali Najafi
Vice President for Women and Family Affairs, Shahindokht Molaverdi
 Council of Ministers of Iran
 Ministry of Agricultural, Mahmoud Hojjati
 Ministry of Communications and Information Technology, Mahmoud Vaezi
 Minister of Cooperatives, Mohammad Abbasi
 Minister of Culture and Islamic Guidance, Ali Jannati
 Ministry of Defense and Armed Forces Logistics, Hossein Dehghan
 Ministry of Economic Affairs and Finance, Ali Tayebnia
 Ministry of Education, Ali Asghar Fani
 Ministry of Energy, Hamid Chitchian
 Ministry of Foreign Affairs, Mohammad Javad Zarif
 Minister of Health and Medical Education, Hassan Hashemi
 Ministry of Industries and Business, Mohammadreza Nematzadeh
 Ministry of Intelligence and National Security, Mahmoud Alavi
 Ministry of Interior, Abdolreza Rahmani Fazli
 Ministry of Justice (Iran), Mostafa Pour Mohammadi
 Minister of Labour and Social Affairs, Ali Rabei
 Ministry of Petroleum, Bijan Namdar Zanganeh
 Minister of Science, Research, and Technology, Reza Faraji Dana
 Ministry of Transportation and Housing, Abbas Ahmad Akhoundi
 Ministry of Youth Affairs and Sports, Mahmoud Goudarzi

Legislative branch of the government of Iran 

 Majlis of Iran (unicameral parliament)
 drafts legislation
 ratifies international treaties
 approves the national budget
 Guardian Council
 12 members
 6 appointed by the Supreme Leader
 6 elected by the Majlis
 Powers and responsibilities:
 Supervises elections
 Approves or rejects candidates for president, Majlis, and the Assembly of Experts
 Reviews all bills passed by the Majlis for constitutionality and compatibility with Islamic law, and approves or vetoes them
 Expediency Discernment Council
 Appointed by Supreme Leader
 Main purpose is to mediate disputes between the Majlis and the Council of Guardians
 Also serves as an advisory board to the Supreme Leader

Judicial branch of the government of Iran 

Judicial system of Iran
 Supreme Court of Iran
 Special Clerical Court - for trying Muslim clerics, and accountable only to the Supreme Leader

Foreign relations of Iran 

Foreign relations of Iran
 Iran-Arab relations
 Diplomatic missions in Iran
 Diplomatic missions of Iran

International organization membership 

International organization membership of Iran
The Islamic Republic of Iran is a member of:

Colombo Plan (CP)
Economic Cooperation Organization (ECO)
Food and Agriculture Organization (FAO)
Group of 15 (G15)
Group of 24 (G24)
Group of 77 (G77)
International Atomic Energy Agency (IAEA)
International Bank for Reconstruction and Development (IBRD)
International Chamber of Commerce (ICC)
International Civil Aviation Organization (ICAO)
International Criminal Court (ICCt) (signatory)
International Criminal Police Organization (Interpol)
International Development Association (IDA)
International Federation of Red Cross and Red Crescent Societies (IFRCS)
International Finance Corporation (IFC)
International Fund for Agricultural Development (IFAD)
International Hydrographic Organization (IHO)
International Labour Organization (ILO)
International Maritime Organization (IMO)
International Mobile Satellite Organization (IMSO)
International Monetary Fund (IMF)
International Olympic Committee (IOC)
International Organization for Migration (IOM)
International Organization for Standardization (ISO)
International Red Cross and Red Crescent Movement (ICRM)
International Telecommunication Union (ITU)

International Telecommunications Satellite Organization (ITSO)
Inter-Parliamentary Union (IPU)
Islamic Development Bank (IDB)
Multilateral Investment Guarantee Agency (MIGA)
Nonaligned Movement (NAM)
Organisation of Islamic Cooperation (OIC)
Organisation for the Prohibition of Chemical Weapons (OPCW)
Organization of Petroleum Exporting Countries (OPEC)
Permanent Court of Arbitration (PCA)
Shanghai Cooperation Organisation (SCO) (observer)
South Asian Association for Regional Cooperation (SAARC) (observer)
United Nations (UN)
United Nations Conference on Trade and Development (UNCTAD)
United Nations Educational, Scientific, and Cultural Organization (UNESCO)
United Nations High Commissioner for Refugees (UNHCR)
United Nations Industrial Development Organization (UNIDO)
United Nations Institute for Training and Research (UNITAR)
Universal Postal Union (UPU)
World Confederation of Labour (WCL)
World Customs Organization (WCO)
World Federation of Trade Unions (WFTU)
World Health Organization (WHO)
World Intellectual Property Organization (WIPO)
World Meteorological Organization (WMO)
World Tourism Organization (UNWTO)
World Trade Organization (WTO) (observer)

Law and order in Iran 

Law of Iran
 Capital punishment in Iran
 Constitution of Iran
 Crime in Iran
 Human rights in Iran (1925–1979)
 Human rights in the Imperial State of Iran (1925–1979)
 Human rights in the Islamic Republic of Iran (1979–present)
 LGBT rights in Iran
 Freedom of religion in Iran
 Law enforcement in Iran

Military of Iran 

Military of Iran
 Command
 Commander-in-chief: Supreme Leader of Iran, Ali Khamenei
 Ministry of Defence of Iran
 Defense industry of Iran
 Forces (Iran has two armies)
 Army of Iran
 Navy of Iran
 Air Force of Iran
 Islamic Revolutionary Guard Corps
 Ground Forces of the Islamic Revolutionary Guard Corps
 Navy of the Islamic Revolutionary Guard Corps
 Aerospace Force of the Islamic Revolutionary Guard Corps
 Quds Force (Special Forces)
 Basij Resistance Force (paramilitary force. Compare with National Guard)
 Iran and weapons of mass destruction
 Military history of Iran
 Military ranks of Iran

Local government in Iran 

Local government in Iran
 City and Village Councils of Iran

History of Iran 

History of Iran
Timeline of the history of Iran
Current events of Iran

 Iran hostage crisis
 History of fundamentalist Islam in Iran
 Military history of Iran
 Iran–Iraq War
 Timeline of the Iranian Islamic revolution
 Chahar-Ai-Ne (Persian چهاﺮآﻳنه)
 Plated mail

History of Iran, by period

Pre-Islam Iranian history
 Palaeolithic Era in Iran
 Archaeological sites in Iran
 Tappeh Sialk
 Jiroft culture
 Kura-Araxes culture
 Atropatene
 Arran (Caucasus)
 Shahr-i Sokhta
 Akkadian Empire
 Elam
 Mannaeans
 Aratta
 Kingdom of Pontus
 Urartu
 Neo-Assyrian Empire
 Neo-Babylonian Empire
 Aratti theory
 Aryan
 Indo-Iranians
 Iran naming convention
 Kassites
 List of ancient Persians
 List of kings of Persia
 Parthia
 Parthian Empire
 Arsacid dynasty of Iberia
 Arsacid dynasty of Armenia
 Arsacid Dynasty of Caucasian Albania
 Persian war elephants
 Median Empire
 Achaemenid Empire
 Greco-Persian Wars
 Seleucid Empire
 Parthian Empire
Roman-Parthian Wars
 Sassanid Empire
Byzantine-Sassanid Wars
Persian Armenia
Asorestan

Post-Islam Iranian history
 Islamicization in Iran
 Islamic Conquest of Iran
 Anglo-Russian Convention of 1907
 Treaty of Gulistan
 Treaty of Akhal
 Treaty of Zuhab
 Treaty of Turkmenchay
 Sallarids
 Ak Koyunlu
 Kara Koyunlu
 Safavids
 Qajar dynasty
 Ottoman-Persian Wars
 Russo-Persian Wars

Pahlavi and contemporary history of Iran
 Constitutionalist movement of Gilan
 List of prime ministers of Iran
 Anglo-Soviet invasion of Iran
 Persian Constitutional Revolution
 Persian Corridor
 White Revolution
 Human rights in the Imperial State of Iran (1925–1979)
 Human rights in the Islamic Republic of Iran (1979–present)
 Iran–Iraq War
 United States support for Iraq during the Iran–Iraq war
 United States support for Iran during the Iran–Iraq war
 1988 Massacre of Iranian Prisoners
 Ahvaz Bombings

History of Iran, by subject 
 History of science in Persia
 Military history of Iran
 Prime Minister of Iran
 Persianization
 Persian mythology
 Iranian continent
 Iranian Azerbaijan
 Iranian Kurdistan
 Iranian peoples
 Iranology
 Islamic Cultural Revolution
 University of Chicago's Persian heritage crisis
 Islam in Iran
 Islamicization in Iran
 Turko-Persian tradition
 Kayanian dynasty

Culture of Iran 

Culture of Iran
 Architecture of Iran
 Cuisine of Iran
 Ethnic minorities in Iran
 Festivals in Iran
 Languages of Iran
 Media in Iran
 Museums in Iran
 National symbols of Iran
 Emblem of Iran
 Flag of Iran
 National anthem of Iran
 People of Iran
 Prostitution in Iran
 Public holidays in Iran
 Records of Iran
 Religion in Iran
 Buddhism in Iran
 Christianity in Iran
 Hinduism in Iran
 Islam in Iran
 History of the Jews in Iran
 List of World Heritage Sites in Iran

Art in Iran 
 Art in Iran
 Cinema of Iran
 Literature of Iran
 Music of Iran
Iranian musical instruments
 Television in Iran
 Iranian theatre

Sports in Iran 

Sports in Iran
 Football in Iran

Economy and infrastructure of Iran 

Economy of Iran
 Economic rank, by nominal GDP (2007): 29th (twenty-ninth)
 Agriculture in Iran
 Banking in Iran
 National Bank of Iran
 Communications in Iran
 Internet in Iran
 Companies of Iran
Currency of Iran: Rial
ISO 4217: IRR
 Economic history of Iran
 Energy policy of Iran
 Health care in Iran
 Industry of Iran
 Mining in Iran
 Petroleum industry in Iran
 Tehran Stock Exchange
 Tourism in Iran
 Transport in Iran
 Airports in Iran
 Rail transport in Iran
 Roads in Iran
 Urban plans in Iran
 Water supply and sanitation in Iran

Education in Iran 

Education in Iran

See also

Iran
Index of Iran-related articles
International rankings of Iran
List of international rankings
List of Iran-related topics
Member state of the United Nations
Outline of Asia
Outline of geography

References

External links

 The President of Iran
 Iran Electoral Archive
 The Majlis (Legislature) of Iran  
 Iran.ir
 Persian language (Persian)
 
 
 
 First Iranians: Reference Articles on Iran By Manouchehr Saadat Noury
Iranian Innovations
 Faces of Iran: The World in One Nation (a sequence of still photographs, showing the richness of the ethnic and religious diversity of the people of Iran), YouTube.
 Rageh Inside Iran, a BBC Four production, 17 February 2007, 
 Farhad Nabipour, From Persia to Iran, Part I, AMIR Productions, 4 November 2006  (slide show accompanied with Pink Floyd and Persian music — 28 min 8 sec), Google. Highly recommended!
 Farhad Nabipour, From Persia to Iran, Part II, AMIR Productions, 10 November 2006  (slide show accompanied with Pink Floyd and Persian music — 21 min 46 sec), Google.
 Some Iranian folk-songs sung by Shusha Guppy in the 1970s: Silver Gun (from Shiraz), Wheat Flower (a harvest song), The Rain (from the Gilan Province), The Stars in Heaven (from Shiraz), On Top of the Hill (from Shiraz), The Silken Handkerchief (from the Fars Province), Darling Leila (from the Gilan Province), I Have Come to Ravish My Heart (from the Lorestan Province), The Lor Youth (a Bakhtiari-Tribe song), Lullaby (from Gorgan), Girl from Boyer-Ahmadi Tribe (from the Kohgiluyeh and Boyer-Ahmad Province), My Beloved is Short (from the Fars Province), The Water Pipe, You Must Come to Me (from Mamasani County), Darling Dareyne (from the Mazandaran Province).  For further details see: Iranian.
 Nir Rosen, Selling the War with Iran, The Washington Note, Thursday, May 1, 2008, .
 The Second International Festival of Peace Poetry, Iran, 16 May 2009: (English), (Persian).

 
 
Iran